Mira is a 2022 Russian science-fiction disaster film directed by Dmitry Kiselyov about family values and love for one's family and friends. It stars Veronika Ustimova and Anatoliy Beliy.

It was theatrically released on December 22, 2022. In Russia, the film was released on the night of December 18, 2022, as promoted by First channel.

Plot 
The film tells about a girl named Lera Arabova, who lives in Vladivostok. Her father works on the orbital space station "Mira" and gradually moves away from his daughter. And suddenly a meteor shower hit her house, as a result of which Lera decides to unite with her dad and save her hometown.

Cast 
 Veronika Ustimova as Valeria "Lera" Arabova
 Anatoliy Beliy as Arabov, an astronaut
 Alexander Petrov as Egor, Valeria's younger brother
 Yevgeny Yegorov as Misha, Valeria's friend
 Darya Moroz as Svetlana, Valeria's mother
 Maksim Lagashkin as Boris, Svetlana's second husband, and Valeria's stepfather
 Kirill Zaytsev as Antonov, an astronaut, Arabov's commander
 Igor Khripunov as Ryabinov, a colleague of Arabov and Antonov
 Andrey Smolyakov as Fomin, a high-ranking officer of the Mission Control Center
 Kristina Korbut as Olya
 Marina Burtseva as Tanya

Production 
The disaster film Mira was presented to Russia's Cinema Foundation in 2021 but did not receive the grant.

The film was directed by Dmitry Kiselyov, the main roles were given to Veronika Ustimova and Anatoliy Beliy. Mars Media Entertainment film company was responsible for the production of the film together with AMedia, with the support of Cinema Foundation.

A project with a budget of ₽540 million, the film received funding in the amount of 187 million rubles only once. In the summer of 2022, the production companies requested another ₽163 million from Cinema Foundation.

Filming 
Saturated principal photography lasted from early August to early November 2021 in Moscow, the region of Moscow Oblast, and Vladivostok.

Post-production 
The visual effects were handled by Main Road Post, who had previously worked on the films Attraction (2017 film) and Invasion (2020 film).

Release

Marketing 
The first teaser trailer of Mira was released on October 24, 2022.

Theatrical 
Mira premiered worldwide on December 22, 2022, by "Cinema Atmosphere" Film Distribution. In Russia, it premiered on December 18, 19:00 Moscow time in theaters (December 19 elsewhere in Russia).

Reception 
The film received a generally positive reception from critics and audiences, with praise for the acting, special effects, and story, though some criticism was directed at the length of the film.

References

External links 
 

2022 films
2020s Russian-language films
2020s disaster films
2020s science fiction adventure films
Russian disaster films
Russian science fiction adventure films
Russian children's adventure films
Russian coming-of-age films
Space adventure films
Films about astronauts
Films about father–daughter relationships
Films shot in Moscow
Films shot in Moscow Oblast